The Freedom School was located in Colorado, United States, offering a series of lectures by libertarian theorist Robert LeFevre from 1957 to 1968. LeFevre extended this work to the related Rampart College, an unaccredited four-year school, in 1963. Both shared the same campus. In 1965, a flood devastated the campus, and the school and college were moved to Santa Ana, California, where they lasted until at late 1975. They were succeeded by the Rampart Institute.  LeFevre stepped down as president in 1973, succeeded by Sy Leon.  A new Freedom School was established in January 2010 to carry on in the LeFevre tradition.

References

Libertarian organizations based in the United States
Educational organizations based in the United States